Henicopsaltria is a genus of cicada in the cryptotympanini tribe of the Cicadinae subfamily. Four species have been described. The razorgrinder (Henicopsaltria eydouxii) is the type species.

References

Arenopsaltriini
Cicadidae genera